Steve, Steven or Stephen Cohen may refer to:

Sportspeople
Stephan Cohen (born 1971), French pocket billiards player
Steve Cohen (gymnast) (born 1946), American Olympic gymnast
Steve Cohen (judoka) (born 1955), American judoka and Olympian
Steve Cohen (wrestler) (born 1963), South African wrestler better known as Steve Simpson
Steven Cohen (footballer) (born 1986), French association football player

Academics
Stephen P. Cohen (1936–2019), American academic and senior fellow in foreign policy studies at the Brookings Institution
Stephen F. Cohen (1938–2020), American scholar specializing in Russian studies
Stephen P. Cohen (Middle East scholar) (1945–2017), Canadian scholar specializing in Middle Eastern affairs
Steven M. Cohen (born 1950), American sociologist
Steven A. Cohen (academic) (born 1953), American environmental writer and academic

Others
Steve Cohen (businessman) (born 1956), hedge fund manager and owner of the New York Mets baseball team
Steve Cohen (politician) (born 1949), politician from Tennessee
Steve Cohen (magician) (born 1971), parlor magician from New York City
Stephen Cohen (entrepreneur) (born 1982), American entrepreneur and computer scientist
Steve Cohen (author) (active since 1983), author and lawyer
Stephen M. Cohen (active since 1995), American criminal

See also
Stephen Cohn (active since 1966), American composer